Piledriver: The Wrestling Album II is the second soundtrack album released by the World Wrestling Federation (WWF, now WWE). It was released on September 21, 1987 by Epic Records. It featured actual vocal performances from several of the wrestlers themselves.

The original vinyl LP release of Piledriver featured a head shot of Hulk Hogan wearing a construction hard hat on the front cover.  It is the only WWF/WWE album to have not been released on CD.  In addition to the album, a VHS videotape version was also issued in 1987 by Coliseum Video. This tape featured music videos for 8 of the songs from the album (the songs "Crank It Up" and "Waking Up Alone" did not have music videos made for them).

Several of the songs on the album would be used as entrance themes for the wrestlers. Strike Force used an instrumental version of "Girls in Cars" until their split in 1989, Koko B. Ware used "Piledriver" into 1990, Honky Tonk Man used his self-titled track for the majority of his career, "Demolition" was used for the team until late 1990, "Jive Soul Bro" was used as the theme of Slick and several of his wrestlers until 1990, and "Crank It Up" was used for the tag team of The Young Stallions (a storyline was created in which Jimmy Hart wanted to use the song for The Hart Foundation, but the Stallions "stole" it).

Track listing
 Robbie Dupree & Strike Force – "Girls in Cars" – 3:34
 Koko B. Ware – "Piledriver" – 2:55
 The Honky Tonk Man – "Honky Tonk Man" – 2:09
 Derringer – "Demolition" – 3:14
 Slick – "Jive Soul Bro" – 3:35
 Jimmy Hart – "Crank It Up" – 2:42
 Hillbilly Jim & Gertrude – "Waking Up Alone" – 2:59
 Vince McMahon – "Stand Back" – 3:02
 "Mean" Gene Okerlund & Derringer – "Rock and Roll, Hoochie Koo" – 3:40
 The WWF Superstars – "If You Only Knew" – 3:18

Personnel

Production 
Executive Producer: David Wolff
Producer: Rick Derringer
Co-Producer: David Wolff
Recorded and Mixed by: Tom Edmonds
WWF Music Director: Jim Johnston
Project Administrator: Laura Adler
Art Director/Cover Design: Brian Penry
Photographer: Stephen H. Taylor
Illustration: Brian Penry, Tom Brenner
Photo Studio: Chris Meech, Images IV
Make-up: Amanda Wallingford
Legal Affairs: Ed Kelman
A&R Consultant: Michael Caplan
Product Manager: John Doelp
Assistant Engineers: Oz Fritz and Anita Sobelson
Recorded at: Platinum Island Recording Studio (NYC), The Hit Factory (NYC)
Mixed at: Platinum Island Recording Studio
Special Thanks: Top Kat Studios (NYC), Dallas Sound Lab, Nicollet Sound (Minneapolis), The Metalworks Studios (Toronto), Vernie "Butch" Taylor (Guitar on "Jive Soul Bro"), Rosemary Mulligan

Musicians 
Drums: Bernard Kenny, Kevin Hupp, Chuck Bürgi, Robert Ford, Bobby Leonard
Guitars: Rick Derringer, Vernie "Butch" Taylor
Bass: Charles Torres-Mass, Rick Derringer, Howard Cloud
Keyboards: Vinnie Martucci, Rick Derringer, Paul Griffin, George Pavlis
Horns: Joshua Schneider, Don Hahn, Richie Cannata, Marion Meadows, Steve Sechi
Background Vocals: Elaine Goff, Amy Goff, Bernard Kenny, Rick Derringer, D.L. Byron, Randi Michaels, Cookie Watkins, Dennis Feldman, Robbie Dupree, Randy Rolin, Steve Johnstad, Vernie "Butch" Taylor

See also

Music in professional wrestling

References

WWE albums
1987 compilation albums
1987 soundtrack albums
Epic Records compilation albums
Epic Records soundtracks